Brome is a surname. Notable people with the surname include:

Alexander Brome (1620–1666), English poet
Bartholomew Brome (fl. 1589), English politician
Richard Brome (1590–1653), English dramatist
Vincent Brome (1910–2004), English writer

See also
Adam de Brome (died 1332), English almoner and college founder